Corruption in the United States is the act of government officials abusing their political powers for private gain, typically through bribery or other methods, in the United States government. Corruption in the United States has been a perennial political issue, peaking in the Jacksonian era and the Gilded Age before declining with the reforms of the Progressive Era.

As of 2022 the United States is the 27th least corrupt country according to the Corruption Perceptions Index.

History

18th century 
Corruption in the United States dates back to the founding of the country. The American Revolution was, in part, a response to the perceived corruption of the British monarchy. Separation of powers was developed to enable accountability. Freedom of association also served this end, allowing citizens to organize independently of the government. This was in contrast to some European powers at the time where all associations and economic activities were implicitly managed by the government. 

During the 1st United States Congress, Secretary of the Treasury Alexander Hamilton proposed several new economic initiatives that involved taxes, tariffs, debts, and a national bank. Fears that these proposals would lead to corruption grew so great that the Democratic-Republican Party was formed to oppose them.

19th century 
Corruption reemerged as a major theme in American politics in the 1824 United States presidential election, where Andrew Jackson ran as an anti-corruption candidate. The issue was only exasperated by the controversial results of the election preventing Jackson's victory, known as the corrupt bargain. Following Jackson's victory in the next election, a dispute over the national bank again became relevant in the issue of corruption.

In state governments, authorities would authorize corporate charters to authorize the creation of new corporations. These faced some resistance due to their potential for corruption. While they were generally used in ways that promoted the economic development of the states, there were instances of charters being given preferential treatment to political allies. The Albany Regency, for example, authorized charters for banks in exchange for political and financial support. This issue was eventually solved as state governments standardized the process of incorporation throughout the 1840s.

The Gilded Age was a period of increased prosperity and growth in the United States. This growth resulted in a corresponding increase of corruption and bribery in the government and in business. The main issue of contention was the spoils system, in which government jobs were given in exchange for political support. This issue was addressed by civil service reform.

The Presidency of Ulysses S. Grant during the Gilded Age was mired with instances of corruption. Grant had been elected without political experience, and he had little ability to control or regulate the members of his government, who proceeded to take advantage of his inexperience. Notable examples include the Whiskey Ring, the Star Route scandal, and the trader post scandal. The Crédit Mobilier scandal also became public information at this time.

20th century 
The Progressive Era was a period of anti-corruption fervor in the United States led by the progressive movement. During this time, political machines and monopolies were targeted and disestablished. Theodore Roosevelt was a major figure in the Progressive Era, leading the efforts of trustbusting.

The Teapot Dome scandal was a major instance of corruption during the Presidency of Warren G. Harding. Secretary of the Interior Albert B. Fall had accepted bribes from oil companies in exchange for access to government petroleum reserves. After the corruption was discovered, Fall was sentenced to prison.

Richard Nixon was notably the subject of multiple corruption allegations. While running for Vice President in 1952, Nixon famously gave a speech declaring that he accepted one gift, a dog named Checkers, and that he had no intention of returning it. During Nixon's presidency, he was implicated in the Watergate scandal. Shortly before, his Vice President Spiro Agnew had been found guilty of tax fraud.

In the 1970s, the FBI conducted the sting operation codenamed Abscam to uncover corruption in Congress. Seven members of Congress were convicted of bribery.

Contemporary corruption 
The United States' perceived resistance to corruption has declined in recent years, dropping its rank as 18th in 2016 to 27th out of 180 on the Transparency International Corruption Perceptions Index of 2021. In 2019, Transparency International stated that the United States is "experiencing threats to its system of checks and balances", along with an "erosion of ethical norms at the highest levels of power", citing populism, nativism, and political polarization as factors that may increase corruption. Some state governments are also currently known to have corruption issues compared to other states with Louisiana, Illinois and Tennessee were labeled "The worst of the worst" in 2018.

The FBI is responsible for investigating corruption in the United States with several initiatives to investigate both domestic and foreign corruption, and it recognizes public corruption as its "top criminal investigative priority". 

In 2019, Stephen Walt argued that the United States was becoming increasingly corrupt, pointing to the Trump administration, the causes of the Great Recession, the failure of the Boeing 737 MAX, and the 2019 college admissions bribery scandal as examples. Walt argues that these examples show that corruption is a growing problem in the United States and in the longer term threaten the country's soft power. The United States has been cited as a tax haven. The Foreign Account Tax Compliance Act make it so that foreign governments had to reveal American accounts abroad, though they made it so the US was also under no compunction, legal or otherwise, to share information on non-Americans opening up accounts in the US. In 2020 U.S. ranked second in the Financial Secrecy Index behind only the Cayman Islands. In 2016 one estimate placed the total offshore wealth in the US at $800 billion.

See also 
 Corruption in the United States Border Patrol
 List of United States federal officials convicted of corruption offenses
List of United States state officials convicted of federal corruption offenses
List of United States local officials convicted of federal corruption offenses
 United States as a tax haven

References

Further reading

External links

United States at the Business Anti-Corruption Portal
United States at Transparency International
United States at the Global Corruption Barometer

 
United States